Commodore James Gother (died 1696) was a Royal Navy officer who briefly served as Commander-in-Chief, The Thames from 7 April 1696 to 15 April 1696.

Naval career
Promoted to captain in May 1689, Gother commanded, successively, the fourth-rate , the third-rate  and the second-rate . He was court-martialled for failing to intercept the privateer, Jean Bart, and for allowing him to slip through a blockade and into Dunkirk in 1691. He then saw action in HMS Restoration during the action at Barfleur in May 1692. He briefly served as Commander-in-Chief, The Thames from 7 April 1696 to 15 April 1696.

References

1696 deaths
Royal Navy commodores